Real World Seattle: Bad Blood is the thirty-second season of MTV's reality television series Real World, which focuses on a group of diverse strangers living together for several months in a different city each season as cameras document their lives and interpersonal relationships. It is the ninth season to be filmed in the Pacific States region of the United States, specifically in Washington, and is also the third season to be filmed in the Pacific Northwest after The Real World: Portland.

The season featured a total of fourteen people, consisting of seven original roommates and seven additional permanent roommates who lived in the Capitol Hill neighborhood of Seattle, Washington. This season follows a theme, similar to the past three seasons. It is the tenth season to take place in a city that had hosted a previous season, as the show's seventh season was set in Seattle in 1998. Seattle was first reported as the location for the thirty-second season by the website Vevmo on May 22, 2016. Production began on June 30, and concluded on August 27, 2016 totaling up to 58 days of filming.

The season premiered on October 12 of that year on MTV and the MTV app, and concluded with the season finale on January 4, 2017, consisting of 12 episodes. This is the last season to air on MTV before the show changed to distribution via Facebook Watch through MTV Studios and Bunim/Murray Productions.

Season changes
Most seasons of Real World have a phone room so the cast members can make calls. On this season, the production crew provided the cast members smartphones so they could take their own pictures, have calls, and send text messages to families, one another, and close friends. This is the first time cast have been given personal communication devices since the cast of the tenth season were given two-way pagers and limited cell phones the cast of the Philadelphia season got to use when out of the house.

The residence
During shooting, the cast lived at the Ballou Wright Building located at 1517 12th Avenue between E. Pike Street and E. Pine Street in the Capitol Hill neighborhood.

Cast
This was the first season of Real World to feature fourteen cast members consisting of seven original roommates and seven additional roommates. The season started off with seven roommates, and then the cast was joined by seven additional roommates. The additional roommates are "Bad Blood", people who the originals once got along with but now have a rift with due to various issues. The Bad Blood were told by production they were cast for Road Rules until they arrived for filming.

 Age at start of filming

Duration of Cast 

Notes

Episodes

After filming

Peter and Jennifer moved in together right after the show, but reportedly called it quits in September 2017.

Anika Rashaun moved to Los Angeles and launched a life coaching website.

The Challenge

References

External links
 Official site. MTV.com

2016 American television seasons
2017 American television seasons
Seattle (2016)
Television shows set in Seattle
2016 in Seattle
2017 in Seattle
Television shows filmed in Washington (state)